Ambrose is a given name. It is derived from Greek ambrosios, meaning (belonging to) immortal(s), god-like; cf. ambrosia, food of gods. Notable people with the name include:
St Ambrose of Milan
St. Ambrose Traversari, also referred to as Ambrose of Camaldoli, (1386–1439), Italian monk and theologian
Ambrose Akinmusire (born 1982), Nigerian-American jazz trumpeter
Ambrose Bierce (1842–1913), American author
Ambrose Burnside (1824–1881), American general and namesake of sideburns
Ambrose Mandvulo Dlamini (1968–2020), Swazi politician and businessman
Ambrose Gaines IV (born 1959), American swimmer better known as Rowdy Gaines
Ambrose K. Hutchison (1856–1932), Hawaiian resident leader of the leper settlement of Kalaupapa
Ambrose O'Brien (1885–1968), Canadian industrialist
Ambrose Small (1863–1919), Canadian theatre magnate
Ambrose Tarrant (1866–1938), Australian cricketer
Ambrose Parry, pseudonym of Scottish authors Chris Brookmyre and Marisa Haetzman

Amby 
Amby Burfoot (born 1946), American long-distance runner and journalist
Amby Fogarty (1933–2016), Irish footballer
Amby McConnell (1883–1942), American baseball player
Amby Paliwoda (1909–1999), American animator

See also
 Ambrož (disambiguation)
 Amvrosy

References

English masculine given names